Hucun may refer to the following locations in China:

 Hucun, Fujian (湖村镇), town in Ninghua County
 Hucun, Hebei (户村镇), town in Handan County
 Hucun, Shanxi (胡村镇), town in Taigu County